Upass is a prepaid card for the transportation system in Seoul and its suburbs. This card is issued by Seoul Bus Transport Association and eB Card. Its parent-generation card is Seoul Transportation Card, a world-first commercial-used RF card for transportation (first used in June 1996)¹. The Korean system integrator Intec and Seoul Bus Union first launched a test of their system in a trial from October to December 1995. Old Seoul Transportation Card and T-money can be used along with Upass.

Technology
Upass, and older Seoul transportation card system is based on MIFARE Standard, Ultralight and PROX technology.

Use
Many kiosks around Seoul sells various types of Upass cards. Major banks and credit card companies, including favored Kookmin Bank and BC Card, issue Upass compatible credit/debit cards marked with PayOn, MasterCard, Paypass or Visa Paywave. Upass is accepted by:
 All Seoul, Gyeonggi-do, Incheon, Cheonan, Asan buses
 Seoul Subway and AREX
 Some Gyeonggi-do intercity buses. These buses are marked with yellow and orange 'Transportation Card Acceptance' stickers. Note that Gyeonggi-do intercity buses often run between other areas.

Notes

External links
 Seoul Bus Transport Association (Korean with some English)

Contactless smart cards
Fare collection systems in South Korea
Transport in Seoul
Financial services companies of South Korea